Koniec may refer to the following places:
Koniec, Kuyavian-Pomeranian Voivodeship (north-central Poland)
Koniec, Lublin Voivodeship (east Poland)
Koniec, Subcarpathian Voivodeship (south-east Poland)